Andrew J. O'Donnell Jr. (March 10, 1925 – April 22, 2019) was an American former professional basketball player. He played in the National Basketball Association for the Baltimore Bullets during the 1949–50 season, making his debut on January 19, 1950. He was the first Loyola University Maryland player to play in the NBA.

NBA career statistics

Regular season

References

External links

1925 births
2019 deaths
American Basketball League (1925–1955) players
American men's basketball players
American military personnel of World War II
Baltimore Bullets (1944–1954) players
Basketball players from Pennsylvania
Guards (basketball)
Loyola Greyhounds men's basketball players
People from Luzerne County, Pennsylvania
Reading Rangers players
Undrafted National Basketball Association players